is a Japanese manga series written by Riichiro Inagaki and illustrated by Ryoichi Ikegami. It has been serialized in Shogakukan's seinen manga magazine Big Comic Superior since December 2020.

Publication
Written by Riichiro Inagaki and illustrated by Ryoichi Ikegami, Trillion Game started in Shogakukan's seinen manga magazine Big Comic Superior on December 11, 2020. Shogakukan has collected its chapters into individual tankōbon volumes. The first volume was released on March 30, 2021. As of October 28, 2022, five volumes have been released.

Volume list

Reception
Trillion Game was one of the fifty nominees for the Next Manga Award in 2021. It ranked #8 on Takarajimasha's Kono Manga ga Sugoi! 2022 list of best manga for male readers. It was nominated for the 15th Manga Taishō in 2022 and placed sixth with 55 points.

References

External links
 

Seinen manga
Shogakukan manga